UGC 12682 is an irregular galaxy, located in the constellation of Pegasus.

In November 2008, 14-year-old amateur astronomer Caroline Moore from Warwick, New York, became the youngest supernova discoverer when she found SN 2008ha in UGC 12682.

See also
 Irregular galaxy
 Uppsala General Catalogue

References

12682
71801
+03-60-007
Pegasus (constellation)
Irregular galaxies